Robert Brown was an Anglican priest in Ireland.

Brown educated at Trinity College, Dublin. He was Archdeacon of Killala  from 1661 until 1673; and Prebendary of Killaraght in St. Crumnathy's Cathedral, Achonry from 1670 to 1673.

Notes

Alumni of Trinity College Dublin
17th-century Irish Anglican priests
Archdeacons of Killala